BBC TV Europe was a BBC subscription-funded television service established in 1987, serving continental Europe, initially Scandinavia. It was available on satellite and cable.

The channel was branded as BBC 1/2 Mix when it launched on 4 June 1987, but was rebranded as BBC TV Europe on 1 April 1989.

Initially, two regional telecommunications companies in Denmark, KTAS (Københavns Telefon A/S) and JTAS (Jydsk Telefon A/S) contacted the BBC with a view to retransmit both BBC1 and 2 on their cable networks in Denmark, offering the BBC payment to cover the costs of the satellite slots. The BBC's commercial division, BBC Enterprises, looked into the proposal but found it would be impossible to secure rights for this. This led the BBC to instead create a separate new channel for Denmark, known as BBC 1/2 Mix. This later expanded to Norway in late 1987 and Sweden in early 1988.
  
The channel broadcast a mix of the programmes shown on BBC1 and BBC2 in the United Kingdom, as well as the BBC's domestic BBC Six O'Clock News bulletin, together with the regional news service from London. BBC1 programming took priority: when a programme on BBC1 could not be shown on the channel for rights reasons, it was replaced with a programme shown on BBC2.

The channel was managed and operated by the BBC, but jointly marketed by the two Danish telecommunications companies. However, they were not able to make a profit from the channel, and sold their interest in it to the BBC, which renamed it BBC TV Europe and took full control of its operations and commercialisation, making it available to the whole of Western and Northern Europe (excluding the UK), and also making it officially available for individual viewers who wished to receive it directly via satellite by means of subscription. In 1990, a second service for non-UK viewers entitled "Enterprise Channel" was launched to complement the main BBC TV Europe service, but by the end of that year it had been folded back into the existing network.

On 11 March 1991 the channel was replaced by BBC World Service Television.

References

Defunct BBC television channels
International BBC television channels
Television channels and stations established in 1987
Television channels and stations disestablished in 1991
1987 establishments in Europe
1991 disestablishments in Europe